The Emsley Carr Mile is an annual invitational athletics running event held in the United Kingdom over one mile for men. The race was won in 2022 by the British athlete Matthew Stonier.

History
The race was inaugurated in 1953 by Sir William Carr in memory of his father Sir Emsley Carr, a former editor of the News of the World. The event was created to encourage athletes to break the four-minute mile. By the second time the race was run, Roger Bannister had already broken the world record on 6 May 1954 at the annual athletics event between the Amateur Athletics Association (AAA) and Oxford University at the Iffley Road Track in Oxford. Bannister never did run in the Emsley Carr Mile.

 

The winners of the race sign the Emsley Carr Trophy, a red Moroccan leather-bound book, now running into a second volume since 1980.
It contains a history of mile running since 1868 from around the world and also includes signatures of many of the world's leading milers, including Paavo Nurmi, Sydney Wooderson, John Landy, Gordon Pirie, and Roger Bannister. The race has been won by eleven Olympic champions, Kip Keino, Steve Ovett, Murray Halberg, John Walker, Sebastian Coe, Saïd Aouita, William Tanui, Vénuste Niyongabo, Haile Gebrselassie, Asbel Kiprop, and Hicham El Guerrouj. It has also been won by seven athletes who have held the world record for the mile: Walker, Ovett, Coe, El Guerrouj, Filbert Bayi, Derek Ibbotson and Jim Ryun.

 Ken Wood, a former Sheffield athlete, won the Emsley Carr Mile a record four times. The fastest time recorded for the event stands at 3:45.96 by El Guerrouj in 2000. It is the ninth fastest time ever recorded for the mile, and the fastest time recorded on British soil. El Guerrouj won the Emsley Carr Mile in 2000, 2001 and 2002. 

In 1969 Sir William Carr decided not to continue sponsoring the race and the AAA took it over and continued until he died in 1977. Since 1977, Emsley Carr's grandson, William, has continued with the tradition and has kept the book up to date and has provided a glass piece, presented to the winner by a member of the Carr family.

Winners

See also
 Mile run world record progression
 Four-minute mile
 Dicksonpokalen
 Dream Mile
 Wanamaker Mile

Notes

List of winners
Butler, Mark, Emsley Carr Mile Association of Road Racing Statisticians, 5 October 2006; Retrieved 23 January 2011

External links 
 
Mile races
Recurring sporting events established in 1953
Athletics in London
Athletics in the United Kingdom
Men's athletics competitions